Perfectly Frank is an album by Tony Bennett, released in 1992 and recorded as a tribute to Frank Sinatra.

Part of Bennett's late-in-life comeback to commercial success, it achieved gold record status in the United States and won the Grammy Award for Best Traditional Pop Vocal Performance in 1993.

In 2006, the album was reissued with the same contents as Perfectly Frank: An American Classic Celebrates 80, in conjunction with Bennett's 80th birthday.

Track listing
 "Time After Time" (Sammy Cahn, Jule Styne) – 3:32
 "I Fall in Love Too Easily" (Cahn, Styne) – 2:01
 "East of the Sun (and West of the Moon)" (Brooks Bowman) – 4:11
 "Nancy (with the Laughing Face)" (Phil Silvers, Jimmy Van Heusen) – 3:14
 "I Thought About You" (Johnny Mercer, Van Heusen) – 2:55
 "Night and Day" (Cole Porter) – 3:35
 "I've Got the World on a String" (Harold Arlen, Ted Koehler) – 2:52
 "I'm Glad There Is You" (Jimmy Dorsey, Paul Madeira) – 3:14
 "A Nightingale Sang in Berkeley Square" (Eric Maschwitz, Manning Sherwin) – 2:55
 "I Wished on the Moon" (Dorothy Parker, Ralph Rainger) – 3:08
 "You Go to My Head" (J. Fred Coots, Haven Gillespie) – 3:46
 "The Lady Is a Tramp" (Lorenz Hart, Richard Rodgers) – 2:25
 "I See Your Face Before Me" (Howard Dietz, Arthur Schwartz) – 2:58
 "Day In, Day Out" (Rube Bloom, Mercer) – 2:07
 "Indian Summer" (Al Dubin, Victor Herbert) – 2:59
 "Call Me Irresponsible" (Cahn, Van Heusen) – 3:24
 "Here's That Rainy Day" (Sonny Burke, Van Heusen) – 3:31
 "Last Night When We Were Young" (Arlen, Yip Harburg) – 2:25
 "I Wish I Were in Love Again" (Hart, Rodgers) – 2:14
 "A Foggy Day" (George Gershwin, Ira Gershwin) – 2:12
 "Don't Worry 'bout Me" (Bloom, Koehler) – 4:53
 "One for My Baby (and One More for the Road)" (Arlen, Mercer) – 3:24
 "Angel Eyes" (Earl Brent, Matt Dennis) – 2:42
 "I'll Be Seeing You" (Irving Kahal, Sammy Fain) – 2:56

Personnel
 Tony Bennett - vocals
 Ralph Sharon - piano
 Paul Langosch - double bass
 Joe LaBarbera - drums

References

1992 albums
Tony Bennett albums
Columbia Records albums
Frank Sinatra tribute albums
Grammy Award for Best Traditional Pop Vocal Album